Benedicta Ajudua (born 10 July 1975) is a Nigerian sprinter who specializes in the 100 metres.

She finished seventh in 4 x 400 metres relay at the 2000 Summer Olympics with teammates Glory Alozie, Mercy Nku and Mary Onyali.

External links
 Sports Reference

1980 births
Living people
Nigerian female sprinters
Athletes (track and field) at the 2000 Summer Olympics
Olympic athletes of Nigeria
Olympic female sprinters
20th-century Nigerian women